The presidents of the Osler Club of London have been:

1950-1961

1961-1971

1971-1981

1981-1991

1991-2001

2001-2011

2011-2019

See also
Osler Club of London

References 

Lists of presidents of organizations
Presidents of the Osler Club of London